The 1982 Major League Baseball All-Star Game was the 53rd midseason exhibition between the all-stars of the American League (AL) and the National League (NL), the two leagues comprising Major League Baseball. The game was played on July 13, 1982, at Olympic Stadium in Montreal, Quebec, Canada, home of the Montreal Expos of the National League.  The game resulted in a 4–1 victory for the NL, and Cincinnati Reds shortstop Dave Concepción was named the MVP.

It is notable for being the first All-Star Game ever played outside the United States. This would be the only All-Star Game to be played in Montréal, as the Expos would leave in 2005 to become the Washington Nationals before having an opportunity to host another. Four members of the Expos were voted into the starting lineup.  The flyover at the conclusion of the National Anthems was done for the first time by a national air squadron other than those from the United States Air Force or Air National Guard as the Snowbirds from the Canadian Forces Air Command flew over Olympic Stadium, marking the first of their two All-Star appearances; they would perform the flyover for the 1991 Major League Baseball All-Star Game in Toronto nine years later.  It is also the last All-Star Game in which the manager of the runner-up for any league pennant managed in place of the manager of the defending league champions due to the latter's unemployment; Billy Martin of the Oakland Athletics managed in place of Bob Lemon, who had been fired by the New York Yankees, Martin's former team.

Rosters
Players in italics have since been inducted into the National Baseball Hall of Fame.

American League

National League

Game

Umpires

Starting lineups

Game summary

The AL drew first blood in the first off NL starter Steve Rogers when Reggie Jackson drove home Rickey Henderson with a sacrifice fly. Dave Concepción responded for the NL with a two-run homer in the second off AL starter Dennis Eckersley and the NL never looked back.  The NL tacked on a run in the third when Ruppert Jones tripled and Pete Rose hit a sacrifice fly.  The NL got their final run in the sixth on a Gary Carter RBI single that scored then-Expo teammate Al Oliver.

References

External links
Baseball Almanac
Baseball-Reference.com

Major League Baseball All-Star Game
Major League Baseball All-Star Game
Baseball in Montreal
Sports competitions in Montreal
Baseball competitions in Canada
History of Canada (1982–1992)
Major League Baseball All-Star Game
1980s in Montreal
1982 in Quebec
July 1982 sports events in Canada